William Lawrence Adrian (April 16, 1883 – February 13, 1972) was an American prelate of the Catholic Church. He served as bishop of the Diocese of Nashville in Tennessee from 1936 to 1969.

Biography

Early life 
William Adrian was born in Sigourney, Iowa, to Nicholas and Mary (Paulus) Adrian. He earned a Bachelor of Arts degree from St. Ambrose College in Davenport, Iowa in 1906. He then studied at the Pontifical North American College in Rome 

Adrian was ordained to the priesthood in Rome by Cardinal Pietro Respighi for the Diocese of Davenport on April 15, 1911. Following his return to the United States, he served as a professor at St. Ambrose College for twenty-four years and as its vice president from 1932 to 1935; Adrian also coached American football and baseball, and taught Latin and manual training. He became pastor of St. Bridget's Parish in Victor, Iowa in 1935.

Bishop of Nashville 
On February 2, 1936, Adrian was appointed the seventh bishop of the Diocese of Nashville by Pope Pius XII. He learned of his appointment by a letter from the Holy See: "among [his] letters...With trembling fingers [he] opened it and read...and was so overwhelmed with wonder that [he] could read no farther." Adrian received his episcopal consecration on April 16, 1936, from Archbishop Amelto Cicognani at Sacred Heart Cathedral in Davenport, Iowa.  Bishops Henry Rohlman and Moses E. Kiley served as co-consecrators.

Adrian, who became known as a "man who gets things done," oversaw the creation of several parishes, acquisition of a new episcopal residence in East Nashville, Tennessee, remodeling of the Cathedral, and establishment of a diocesan newspaper and the National Council of Catholic Women. In 1954, Adrian ordered the racial desegregation of all parochial schools in Nashville and Davidson County, far ahead of public school desegregation. He attended the Second Vatican Council in Rome from 1962 to 1965.

On September 4, 1969, Pope Paul VI accepted Adrian's resignation as bishop of the Diocese of Nashville and named him titular bishop of Elo. Adrian resigned that post on January 13, 1971.

William Adrian died in Nashville on February 13, 1972, at age 88.

References

External links
William Adrian at DioceseofNashville.com
William Lawrence Adrian at Findagrave.com

Episcopal succession

1883 births
1972 deaths
20th-century Roman Catholic bishops in the United States
Participants in the Second Vatican Council
Roman Catholic bishops of Nashville
People from Sigourney, Iowa
People from Victor, Iowa
Roman Catholic Diocese of Davenport
St. Ambrose University alumni
Religious leaders from Iowa
Catholics from Iowa
St. Ambrose University faculty